The Bull Arab is a type of dog developed in Australia by Mike Hodgens and Heather Rea for pig hunting. The dog was developed from crossing large, strong dogs of which the most common were Bull Terriers, Pointing breeds, and Greyhounds. The result was a medium to large size, short-haired, muscular dog.

The Bull Arab was originally bred for feral pig hunting, and developed to locate pigs, pull them to the ground, and hold them by the ear.

Temperament
Bull Arabs have a calm temperament, are highly intelligent and easily trainable, and are known for their loyalty and their love of people.

The breed has a reputation for aggression which according to RSPCA Australia is due to the media and public perception.  Attacks on people in several states of Australia have been attributed to the breed, although according to the Mackay Regional Council proportionally in no greater numbers than other dog breeds.  Attacks on livestock including the killing of a number of sheep and other animals have been attributed to Bull Arabs that had escaped their owners and/or confinement.  It has been stated that there is a little hard data to support the breed's reputation for aggression and the perception problems are caused by the people who own the dogs and a lack of socialisation.

The breed is cited as being used for companion and therapy animals.

Abandonment
Due to restrictions on rental housing agreements in Queensland that prohibit larger sized dog breeds, many large breeds of dogs including Bull Arabs are often abandoned in that state.  RSPCA Australia also attributes this to a perceived rise in pig hunting, with hunters not desexing their animals, resulting in litters often being dumped.

See also
 Dogs portal
 List of dog breeds

References

Dog breeds originating in Australia
Hunting dogs